Indolestes gracilis is a species of damselfly in the family Lestidae. It is known only from Sri Lanka, South India and Cambodia.

Subspecies
There are three recognized subspecies.
 Indolestes gracilis gracilis - from Sri Lanka
 Indolestes gracilis davenporti - from South India
 Indolestes gracilis expressior - from Cambodia

Indolestes gracilis birmanus (Selys, 1891) described from Myanmar is now considered as a distinct species, Indolestes birmanus.

Description and habitat
It is a medium sized damselfly with blue eyes. Its thorax is black on dorsum with a narrow blue mid-dorsal and broad ante-humeral stripes. The lower edge of the black is like a saw-tooth, followed by azure blue on the base of the lateral sides. Wings are transparent with black or dark reddish-brown pterostigma. Abdomen is azure blue on the sides, broadly black on dorsum up to the basal half of segment 9. The apical half of segment 9 and whole of segment 10 are azure blue. There is a black spot on each side of segment 10. Anal appendages are blue; black on old males.

Female is similar to the male; differs only in the eye color and color of the last segments. Segment 9 is black.

Habitat
Indolestes gracilis gracilis is found in hill tracts up to 6,000 feet in Sri Lanka. Indolestes gracilis davenporti is found south of the Palakkad Gap, from 4,000 to 6,000 feet in Western Ghats.  Indolestes gracilis expressior is found from 1600 to 4500 feet in evergreen forest in eastern Cambodia.

See also 
 List of odonates of Sri Lanka
 List of odonates of India
 List of odonata of Kerala

References 

 http://animaldiversity.org/accounts/Indolestes_gracilis/classification/
 https://web.archive.org/web/20150219172210/http://www.wht.lk/storage/book_downloads/CorrigendaAddendum.pdf
 http://www.wildreach.com/reptile/animals/dragonflies.php
 http://srilankanodonata.blogspot.com/
 http://indiabiodiversity.org/species/show/227456

External links

Lestidae
Odonata of Asia
Insects of Southeast Asia
Damselflies of Sri Lanka
Insects of India
Insects of Myanmar
Insects of Thailand
Least concern biota of Asia
Insects described in 1862